Kenneth Clark Loggins (born January 7, 1948) is an American guitarist, singer and songwriter. His early songs were recorded with the Nitty Gritty Dirt Band in 1970, which led to seven albums recorded as Loggins and Messina from 1972 to 1977. His early soundtrack contributions date back to A Star Is Born in 1976, and he is known as the King of the Movie Soundtrack. As a solo artist, Loggins experienced a string of soundtrack successes, including an Academy Award nomination for "Footloose" in 1985. Finally Home was released in 2013, shortly after Loggins formed the group Blue Sky Riders with Gary Burr and Georgia Middleman. He won a Daytime Emmy Award, two Grammy Awards and was nominated for an Academy Award, a Tony Award and a Golden Globe Award.

Early life 
Loggins was born in Everett, Washington, the youngest of three brothers. His father, Robert George Loggins, was a salesman of English and Irish ancestry, while his mother, Lina (née Massie), was a homemaker of Italian descent, from Avezzano. They lived in Detroit and Seattle before settling in Alhambra, California. Loggins attended San Gabriel Mission High School, graduating in 1966. He formed a band, The Second Helping, that released three singles during 1968 and 1969 on Viva Records. Greg Shaw described the efforts as "excellent punky folk-pop records" that were written by Loggins who was likely to be the bandleader and singer as well; Shaw included "Let Me In" on both Highs in the Mid-Sixties, Volume 2 and the Pebbles, Volume 9 CD.

Loggins had a short gig playing guitar for the New Improved Electric Prunes in 1969 before writing four songs for the Nitty Gritty Dirt Band that were included on their album Uncle Charlie & His Dog Teddy. During his early 20s, he was in the band Gator Creek with Mike Deasy. The first recorded version of "Danny's Song" (later recorded by Loggins and Messina and a No. 7 Hot 100 hit for Anne Murray in 1973) was included on their only album, released on Mercury Records.

Loggins and Messina 
Jim Messina, formerly of Poco and Buffalo Springfield, was working as an independent record producer for Columbia Records in 1970 when he was introduced to Loggins, then a little-known singer-songwriter who was signed to ABC-Dunhill.

The two recorded a number of Loggins's compositions in Messina's home living room. When Columbia signed Loggins (with Messina's help) to a six-album contract, recording began in earnest for Loggins's debut album, with Messina as producer. In addition to providing rehearsal space, equipment and amps, Messina worked long hours with Loggins and encouraged him to buy an electric guitar to play on his debut album. He also assembled The Kenny Loggins Band by summoning his old friends bassist Larry Sims and drummer Merel Bregante (both formerly of the Sunshine Company, a disbanded 1960s group from Los Angeles), violinist/multireedist Al Garth and multireedist Jon Clarke. Keyboardist Michael Omartian also played on the album and despite dropping out at the start of the touring, continued to play keyboards on the next two albums. Los Angeles-based session percussionist Milt Holland, described by Messina as an ethnomusicologist, also contributed.

Messina originally intended to lend his name to the Loggins project only to help introduce the unknown Loggins to Messina's well-established Buffalo Springfield and Poco audiences. But by the time the album was completed, Messina had contributed so much to the album in terms of songwriting, arrangement, instrumentation and vocals that an "accidental" duo was born. Thus the full name of their first album was Kenny Loggins with Jim Messina Sittin' In. The album's first single release, the Caribbean-flavored "Vahevala", found top 3 success on WCFL on May 18, 1972.

Although the album went unnoticed by radio upon release, it eventually found success by fall 1972, particularly on college campuses where the pair toured heavily. Loggins and Messina's vocal harmonies meshed so well that what was begun as a one-off album became an entity in itself. Audiences regarded the pair as a genuine duo rather than as a solo act with a well-known producer. Instead of continuing to produce Loggins as a sole performer, they decided to record as a duo, Loggins & Messina.

"When our first album, Sittin' In, came out, we started receiving a lot of excitement about the music and good sales," Messina recalled in 2005.

Both members of the duo were guitarists: Loggins played rhythm guitar with both acoustic and electric guitar and harmonica and Messina played lead guitar with both acoustic and electric guitar, mandolin and Dobro. Over the next four years they produced five more albums of original material in the studio, plus one album of covers of other artists' material and two live albums. They sold 16 million records and were the most successful duo of the early 1970s, surpassed later in the decade only by Hall & Oates. Their work also included Lynn Anderson's "Listen to a Country Song", which was released in 1972 and reached No. 3 on the charts, "Danny's Song" and "A Love Song", which reached No. 12 in March 1974. A greatest-hits album, The Best of Friends, was released a year after the duo broke up.

The later studio albums often found Loggins and Messina more as two solo artists sharing the same record than as a genuine partnership. As they both noted in 2005, their collaboration eventually became more a competition. The pair had by 1976 quietly but amicably parted to pursue solo careers, following the release of Native Sons and their final concert in Hawaii.

Solo career 
In 1977, Loggins produced his first solo album, Celebrate Me Home, which included the successful song "I Believe in Love", originally sung by Barbra Streisand in A Star Is Born. Nightwatch, a popular album released in 1978, included the hit song "Whenever I Call You Friend", a duet with Stevie Nicks of Fleetwood Mac, co-written with Melissa Manchester. Loggins followed that in 1979 with Keep the Fire and in 1982 with High Adventure. The latter contained his rock duet with Journey frontman Steve Perry, "Don't Fight It", which rose to No. 17 on the US Billboard Top 100. Loggins abandoned the harmonica in his solo career but continued to play guitar, just as he had done with Loggins & Messina.

With Michael McDonald 
Loggins also co-wrote the song "What a Fool Believes" with Michael McDonald. Each recorded his own version of it, with McDonald recording as a member of the Doobie Brothers. Loggins' version was released first, but the Doobie Brothers' version achieved greater success, reaching No. 1 on the pop chart and earning Loggins and McDonald the 1980 Grammy for Song of the Year.

In 1979, Loggins and McDonald wrote "This Is It". The song was a love song and ultimatum to a woman having an affair and stringing her lover along, while refusing to make a final decision. Every phrase or verse in the song implies, "It's him or me" and the lyrics state, "Leave him behind". There is much confusion about this song, because Loggins dedicated the song to his father, who was struggling with cancer. Because the lyrics are so empowering, they might be used for any purpose to imply "victim to victory"...for example, a sports team anthem. The song earned Loggins the Grammy Award for Best Male Pop Vocal Performance. NBC used the song as theme music for its coverage of the NCAA men's basketball tournament in 1980 and 1981.

Soundtracks 
During the next decade, Loggins recorded so many successful songs for film soundtracks that he became known as the King of the Movie Soundtrack. It began with "I'm Alright" from Caddyshack. Hits followed with "Footloose" and "I'm Free (Heaven Helps the Man)" from Footloose; "Meet Me Half Way" from Over the Top; and "Danger Zone" and "Playing with the Boys" from Top Gun. Loggins also performed "Nobody's Fool" for the film Caddyshack II. He performed as a member of USA for Africa on the famine-relief fundraising single "We Are the World", which led to an appearance performing "Footloose" at the Philadelphia leg of the July 13, 1985, Live Aid famine-relief dual-venue charity concert and global television broadcast.

During the 1990s, Loggins continued his album career, including the popular 1994 children's album Return to Pooh Corner, which included the title single, a reworking of "House at Pooh Corner", written for his newborn son Luke.

In 1991, Loggins recorded and produced Leap of Faith, which included the single "Conviction of the Heart". Vice President Al Gore called this song "the unofficial anthem of the environmental movement". On Earth Day 1995, Loggins performed at The National Mall in Washington, D.C. before a live audience of 500,000.

In 1997, Loggins released the album The Unimaginable Life, based on a book he co-wrote with his then wife Julia. Tracks include "Now That I Know Love", "The Art of Letting Go" and "One Chance at a Time". The album was produced by Loggins and Randy Jackson with background vocals by Skyler Jett, Lamont VanHook and Howard Smith.

In 1998, Loggins recorded a version of the Sesame Street song "One Small Voice" for the ABC television special Elmopalooza, which was included as a track on the Grammy Award–winning soundtrack album.

Other work 

Loggins scored a No. 1 single on the Billboard AC chart in 1997 with "For the First Time" (his Oscar-nominated song from One Fine Day). In 2000 he performed the theme song for Disney's The Tigger Movie, "Your Heart Will Lead You Home", which he co-wrote with Richard and Robert Sherman.

In 1999 he appeared as himself on the television show Dharma & Greg in the episode "Tye-Dying the Knot", performing at Abby and Larry's wedding.

In 2004 Loggins appeared as himself in episode three, "Well Well Well," of Fox TV's Method & Red.

In 2005 Loggins and Messina gave a nationwide tour that resulted in the CD and DVD Loggins and Messina Sittin' In Again. The tour's concerts were three hours long with an intermission and included an acoustic set in the middle. Complete with a set change that turned the stage into an old gas station setting, the show had a large IMAG video screen that showed old footage of the band, as well as tribute footage of recently deceased former L&M bandmate Jon Clarke.

In 2007 Loggins joined the new recording company 180 Music for the release of his album How About Now. That year he was also inducted into Hollywood's Sunset Boulevard RockWalk.

In 2009 Loggins recorded a new children's album, All Join In, but it was not released due to complications with his record company. In 2009 Loggins and Messina toured the United States and Canada, reviving their "Sittin' In Again tour".

In 2011 Loggins performed a short tour in South East Asia including Manila, Philippines and Singapore. On June 3, 2011, he performed at the Arcada Theater in St. Charles, Illinois. He stopped by the Eddie and Jobo Show in Chicago to talk about his music, his personal life and what kind of show you can expect from him.

Loggins also appeared as himself in the 2014 series finale "The Father/Daughter Dance" of Raising Hope. He sang "Danny's Song".

The 2016 parody film Donald Trump's The Art of the Deal: The Movie features an original song by Loggins, "The Art of the Deal", written specifically for the film.

In July 2016 Loggins performed on ABC's Greatest Hits.

In January 2017 Loggins was featured with McDonald on Thundercat's single "Show You the Way".

Loggins made a cameo appearance as himself in episode 1 of season 3 of the television show Grace and Frankie.

In October 2018, Loggins received the inaugural Music Icon Award at the San Diego International Film Festival.

On September 22 and 24, 2022, Loggins once again joined Jim Messina at the Hollywood Bowl in Los Angeles, California, for a 50-year anniversary weekend celebration of when they played the Bowl supporting their debut album, Sittin' In. The opening set featured the golden sound of the '70s with songs like "Danny's Song" and "House at Pooh Corner". Loggins took the second act on his own, performing some of his greatest hits such as "I'm All Right", "Footloose" and "Danger Zone".

Blue Sky Riders 
Loggins is a member of Blue Sky Riders, a country music trio also featuring Gary Burr and Georgia Middleman. They released their debut album, Finally Home, on January 29, 2013. The band released a special pre-release edition of their second studio album, Why Not, in 2015 to Kickstarter backers.

Other media 
Loggins appears in the 2013 video game Grand Theft Auto V playing himself as the host of an in-game radio station called Los Santos Rock Radio. He also lends the songs "Danger Zone" and "I'm Free (Heaven Helps the Man)" and sings station jingles.

In 2014, Loggins appeared as himself in the episode "Baby Shower" of the fifth season of the animated comedy series Archer. His song "Danger Zone" had been a recurring joke in the show. At the end of the episode and during the credits, Loggins also performs a country version of "Danger Zone" as a duet with the character of Cherlene. Loggins stated in a later interview that his in-show nickname 'K-Log' is a complete creation of the show, stating, "It was always a joke. That's why it works, because it's so absurd."

In 2018, Loggins lent his voice to a caricature of himself on the animated comedy series Family Guy, in the episode titled "Veteran Guy". He also voiced himself in 2019 in "Yacht Rocky" from season 18 and in 2021 in the episode "80's Guy" from season 20.

In 2022, the Mall of America overlayed their Log Chute attraction into the "Kenny Loggins Chute" for April Fools Day, with the animatronic Paul Bunyan being redressed as Loggins.

Personal life 
Loggins turned down the offer to co-star with Barbra Streisand in A Star Is Born and shortly before Loggins & Messina's final tour, he cut his hand while wood carving, seriously enough to require surgery and preventing him from playing guitar on the tour.

Loggins was married to Eva Ein from 1978 to 1990; they had three children: Crosby, Cody and Isabella. In 2007, the oldest, Crosby Loggins, produced his first CD, We All Go Home. In 2008 Crosby Loggins was voted the winner of the MTV reality show Rock the Cradle. Cody was born in 1983 and Isabella in 1988. As of 2009, Isabella was a music major in college.

When Loggins experienced health problems in 1982, he was referred to Julia Cooper, a colon therapist. They felt an immediate connection. They were both married but unhappy in their relationships. Loggins then had one child and his wife was pregnant with their second. Their relationship was limited to a close friendship for many years. Near the end of the 1980s, Loggins separated from his wife at nearly the same time Julia left her husband and they began a deeper relationship. Loggins's divorce was made final in 1990; he and Cooper married in July 1992. In 1994 they became involved with Equinox International, a multi-level marketing organization and created a promotional video for the company, as did Ted Danson and Dave Parker.

The couple had two children: Lukas, born in 1993 and Hana, born in 1997.  After several years of marriage, they assembled material from the journals each kept, which included poems, songs and letters. They authored a 1997 book, The Unimaginable Life, about their relationship. Its purpose was to offer an alternative to typical relationships where spouses feel they cannot be completely honest. Later on, they faced possible bankruptcy.

The couple divorced in 2004. Loggins said in 2009, "I got pretty blindsided by Julia's decision to leave. She's a very impulsive woman and she found herself going through a midlife crisis and she didn't know what to make of it and it changed her life."

Loggins has a home in the hills north of Santa Barbara, California and has lived there for several decades. He is known locally as a generous fundraiser for numerous charities. Loggins is a second cousin to singer-songwriter Dave Loggins.

Discography

Studio albums 
 Celebrate Me Home (1977)
 Nightwatch (1978)
 Keep the Fire (1979)
 High Adventure (1982)
 Vox Humana (1985)
 Back to Avalon (1988)
 Leap of Faith (1991)
 Return to Pooh Corner (1994)
 The Unimaginable Life (1997)
 December (1998)
 More Songs from Pooh Corner (2000)
 It's About Time (2003)
 How About Now (2007)
 All Join In (2009)

With Loggins and Messina 
 Sittin' In (1971)
 Loggins and Messina (1972)
 Full Sail (1973)
 Mother Lode (1974)
 So Fine (1975)
 Native Sons (1976)

With Blue Sky Riders 
 Finally Home (2013)
 Why Not (2015)

Filmography

Television

Video games

Books

Awards and nominations

References

External links 

 
 Kenny Loggins.com
 Blue Sky Riders official website
 2011 radio interview with Kenny Loggins
 

 
1948 births
20th-century American composers
20th-century American guitarists
20th-century American singers
21st-century American composers
21st-century American singers
American country guitarists
American country rock singers
American country singer-songwriters
American folk guitarists
American harmonica players
American male composers
American male guitarists
American male singer-songwriters
American people of Irish descent
American people of English descent
American people of Italian descent
American pop rock singers
American rock guitarists
American soft rock musicians
Columbia Records artists
Daytime Emmy Award winners
Grammy Award winners
Guitarists from Washington (state)
Living people
Pasadena City College alumni
People from Alhambra, California
Rhythm guitarists
Singer-songwriters from Washington (state)
Walt Disney Records artists
Blue Sky Riders members
Mercury Records artists
The Electric Prunes members
Singer-songwriters from California